Zing! is an American barbershop quartet, which won the Sweet Adelines International Quartet Championship for 2010 in October 2009 in Nashville, Tennessee. Sweet Adelines, "one of the world's largest singing organizations for women", has members over five continents who belong to more than 1200 quartets. The State Library of Kansas, representing the quartet's home state, lists Zing! among its "Musicians of Note". Zing! announced its retirement in November 2012.

Discography
Zing! (CD; 2007)
The Best Seat in the House (CD; 2010)

References

External links
 Official website

Professional a cappella groups
Barbershop quartets
Sweet Adelines International